The engA RNA motif is a conserved RNA structure that was discovered by bioinformatics.
engA motifs are found in bacteria within the genus Prevotella.

engA motif RNAs likely function as cis-regulatory elements, in view of their positions upstream of protein-coding genes.  They are consistently located upstream of genes encoding GTPases, many of which are annotated as encoding the protein EngA.  EngA participates in ribosome stability and assembly.

References

Non-coding RNA